is a retired Japanese professional baseball player from Kōchi, Japan. 

Nishiyama was drafted in the 5th round of the 1988 amateur draft by the Lotte Orions, but did not sign with the team. He entered the professional leagues in 1993 as the 3rd round draft pick of the Yomiuri Giants. He marked a 5-1 record and 7 saves with a stunning 0.55 ERA in his 3rd year, but his pitching deteriorated afterwards. He was a vital part of the relief staff in 1998, marking a 2.48 ERA in 49 appearances, but was inconsistent in the following years. He began throwing from the sidearm in 2002 to fix his control problems, but was not signed for the next season. He currently works as a coach for the Yomiuri Giants organization.

He won a bronze medal in the 1992 Summer Olympics before entering the Japanese professional leagues.

External links
 Career statistics

1970 births
Living people
Baseball people from Kōchi Prefecture
Baseball players at the 1992 Summer Olympics
Olympic baseball players of Japan
Olympic bronze medalists for Japan
Olympic medalists in baseball
Baseball players at the 1990 Asian Games
Medalists at the 1992 Summer Olympics
Asian Games competitors for Japan
Nippon Professional Baseball pitchers
Yomiuri Giants players